Gliese 1002 is a nearby red dwarf star, located  away from the Solar System in the constellation of Cetus. It hosts a system of two known exoplanets.

Planetary system 

Two planetary companions to Gliese 1002 were discovered in 2022 via radial velocity. Both have minimum masses close to that of Earth and orbit within the habitable zone of their star. While these planets do not transit their host star, it may be possible to determine the presence and composition of atmospheres with future instruments such as the ANDES spectrograph for the Extremely Large Telescope.

See also 

 Proxima Centauri b
 Ross 128
 Gliese 1061
 Teegarden's Star

References 

Cetus (constellation)
M-type main-sequence stars
Planetary systems with two confirmed planets
1002
J00064325-0732147
Suspected variables